San Leonino is a village in Tuscany, central Italy, administratively a frazione of the comune of Castellina in Chianti, province of Siena. At the time of the 2001 census its population was 11.

San Leonino is about 19 km from Siena and 7 km from Castellina in Chianti.

References 

Frazioni of Castellina in Chianti